Prokopy (Russian: Прокопий, Greek: Προκόπιος) is a Russian masculine given name of Greek origin. It is also an occasional surname. It may refer to the following people:
Given name
Prokopy Lyapunov (died 1611), Russian statesman 
Prokopy Yelizarov (died 1681), Russian statesman 
Prokopy Zubarev (1886–1938), Russian statesman

Surname
Ronald J. Prokopy (1935–2004), American entomologist

Russian masculine given names